Cantaloupe Island  is an album by French violinist  Jean-Luc Ponty that was recorded in 1969 and released in 1976 by Blue Note. It combines two previously issued albums: King Kong: Jean-Luc Ponty Plays the Music of Frank Zappa and Jean-Luc Ponty Experience with the George Duke Trio, both recorded in 1969 for the World Pacific label.

Reissues
Cantaloupe Island was digitally re-mastered and reissued on CD by BGO in 2006.

Track listing
 "King Kong" (Frank Zappa) – 4:58
 "Idiot Bastard Son" (Zappa) – 4:01
 "Twenty Small Cigars" (Zappa) – 5:35
 "How Would You Like to Have a Head Like That" (Ponty) – 7:18
 "Music for Electric Violin and Low Budget Orchestra" (Zappa) – 19:25
 "America Drinks and Goes Home" (Zappa) – 2:42
 "Foosh" (George Duke) – 9:01
 "Pamukkale" (Dauner) – 6:33
 "Contact" (Ponty) – 7:15
 "Cantaloupe Island" (Herbie Hancock) – 8:28
 "Starlight, Starbright" (Jean-Bernard Eisinger) – 9:23

Personnel
Jean-Luc Ponty – violin, electric violin, baritone violin
Ernie Watts – alto and tenor saxophone
Ian Underwood –  tenor saxophone
George Duke – piano
Frank Zappa – guitar
Wilton Felder – bass
John Heard – bass
Buell Neidlinger – bass
Dick Berk – drums
John Guerin – drums
Art Tripp – drums
Gene Estes – percussion, vibraphone
Arthur Maebe – flugelhorn, French horn, tuben
Vincent DeRosa – French horn, descant
Gene Cipriano – English horn, oboe
Jonathan Meyer – flute
Donald Christlieb – bassoon
Milton Thomas – viola
Harold Bemko – cello, electronic sounds

Production notes
Richard Bock – producer
Frank Zappa – arranger, composer, conductor
Ian Underwood– conductor
Leonard Feather – liner notes
David Brand – engineer
Dick Klune – engineer
Andrew Thompson – remastering
Michael Cuscuna – reissue producer

References

1976 compilation albums
Jean-Luc Ponty albums
Blue Note Records compilation albums